The 2018 United States House of Representatives elections in Mississippi were held on Tuesday, November 6, 2018, to elect the four U.S. representatives from the U.S. state of Mississippi; one from each of the state's four congressional districts. Primaries were held on June 5, 2018. The elections and primaries coincided with the elections and primaries of other federal and state offices.

Overview

District
Results of the 2018 United States House of Representatives elections in Mississippi by district:

District 1

The incumbent is Republican Trent Kelly, who has represented the district since 2015. Kelly was re-elected with 69% of the vote in 2016.

Democratic primary
 Randy Wadkins, professor

Primary results

Republican primary
 Trent Kelly, incumbent

Primary results

General election

Polling

Results

District 2

The incumbent is Democrat Bennie Thompson, who has represented the district since 1993. He was re-elected with 67% of the vote in 2016.

Democratic primary
 Bennie Thompson, incumbent

Primary results

General election

Polling

Results

District 3

The incumbent is Republican Gregg Harper, who has represented the district since 2009. He was re-elected with 66% of the vote in 2016.

In January 2018, Harper announced that he will retire from Congress and not run for re-election in 2018.

Democratic primary
 Michael Aycox
 Michael Evans, state representative

Primary results

Republican primary
 Sally Doty, state senator
 Morgan Dunn, small business owner
 Michael Guest, district attorney of Madison County and Rankin County
 Whit Hughes, businessman
 Perry Parker, businessman
 Katherine Tate

Primary results

Runoff results

General election

Polling

Results

District 4

The incumbent is Republican Steven Palazzo, who has represented the district since 2011. He was re-elected with 65% of the vote in 2016.

Democratic primary
 Jeramey Anderson, state representative

Primary results

Republican primary
 Steven Palazzo, incumbent
 E. Brian Rose, entrepreneur and author

Primary results

General election

Polling

Results

References

External links
Candidates at Vote Smart 
Candidates at Ballotpedia 
Campaign finance at FEC 
Campaign finance at OpenSecrets

Official campaign websites for first district candidates
Randy Wadkins (D) for Congress
Trent Kelly (R) for Congress

Official campaign websites for second district candidates
Troy Ray (I) for Congress
Bennie Thompson (D) for Congress

Official campaign websites for third district candidates
Michael Evans (D) for Congress
Michael Guest (R) for Congress

Official campaign websites for fourth district candidates
Jeramey Anderson (D) for Congress
Steven Palazzo (R) for Congress

Mississippi
2018
United States House of Representatives